The Oakdale Affair and The Rider is a collection of two short novels by American writer Edgar Rice Burroughs. "The Oakdale Affair", a contemporary tale, was written in 1917 under the working title of "Bridge and the Oskaloosa Kid", and is a partial sequel to The Mucker (1914/1916), as Bridge, the protagonist, had been a secondary character in the earlier work. It was first published in Blue Book Magazine in March 1918. "The Rider", a Ruritanian romance, was written in 1915 and first published as "H.R.H. the Rider" as a serial in All-Story Weekly from December 14–18, 1918. The first book publication of the two stories brought them together in one volume as The Oakdale Affair and The Rider, issued by Edgar Rice Burroughs, Inc. in February 1937; the book was reprinted by Grosset & Dunlap in 1937, 1938 and 1940. Both works have since been published separately.

Contents
The Oakdale Affair
The Rider

Copyright
The copyrights for the stories in this collection have expired in the United States and thus now reside in the public domain there.

External links
ERB C.H.A.S.E.R ENCYCLOPEDIA entry for The Oakdale Affair
ERB C.H.A.S.E.R ENCYCLOPEDIA entry for The Rider
The text of The Oakdale Affair at ERBzine.com
Edgar Rice Burroughs Summary Project page for The Oakdale Affair
Edgar Rice Burroughs Summary Project page for H.R.H. The Rider

1918 American novels
1937 books
Short story collections by Edgar Rice Burroughs
Novels by Edgar Rice Burroughs
Novels first published in serial form
Works originally published in Blue Book (magazine)
Works originally published in Argosy (magazine)